HD 167042 b is a gas giant extrasolar planet located approximately 163 light-years away in the constellation of Draco, orbiting the star HD 167042. The mass 1.7 MJ is only minimum since the inclination of the orbital plane is unknown. As it is typical for most known extrasolar planets, it orbits less than 3 AU from the parent star, hence taking less than 2,000 days (5.5 years) to revolve. For this planet, it orbits at 1.30 AU and taking 413 days to revolve around the star. Unlike most exoplanets, the eccentricity of the orbit is low, only 3%.

This planet was discovered in 2007 on September 20 and published on March 1. This planet was typical as it was discovered spectroscopically using the radial velocity method.

See also
 HD 16175 b
 Kappa Coronae Borealis b

References

External links
 

Draco (constellation)
Giant planets
Exoplanets discovered in 2007
Exoplanets detected by radial velocity